Persons Unknown is an internationally co-produced mystery serial drama television series created by Christopher McQuarrie that was aired on NBC in the United States from June 7 to August 28, 2010 and on Rai 2 from September 10 to December 3, 2010. The show revolved around strangers who wake up imprisoned inside a small ghost town with no memory of how they wound up there.

A co-production between the United States, Mexico and Italy, the thirteen-episode summer series premiered on Monday, June 7, 2010 at 10:00 p.m. On June 30, NBC moved the show to 8:00 p.m. on Saturday from its Monday time slot. It completed its run on August 28, 2010.

Overview

Seven diverse strangers, Janet Cooper (Daisy Betts), Joe Tucker (Jason Wiles), Moira Doherty (Tina Holmes), Sergeant Graham McNair (Chadwick Boseman), Tori Fairchild (Kate Lang Johnson), Bill Blackham (Sean O'Bryan), and Charlie Morse (Alan Ruck) awaken in a hotel, in a mostly deserted town, with little to no knowledge of how they got there or where they are. The hotel and small 1950s-era town nearby are completely filled with cameras and microphones. Over the course of the following weeks, they are subjected to significant psychological and physical stress. Meanwhile, an investigative reporter begins to look into the disappearances of the missing people despite intimidation by those who apparently know their every move.

Joe is eventually revealed to be a member of "The Program." It is unclear who or what the Program is, or what their motives, resources, or support are. The only indication is that the Program is manipulating them, attempting to influence their behavior, thought patterns, and beliefs.

At the end of the season, despite staging a mass breakout by faking the deaths of everyone in the town except for Joe, all the participants are recaptured, and awaken in an identical hotel built into the hull of a container ship, where the original night manager welcomes them to "Level 2". Joe and Mark Renbe are seen waking in a second hotel, in which Tori Fairchild serves as the hotel manager. Kat Damatto and Ambassador Fairchild are last seen in cages at an undisclosed location.

Cast

Abductees
Joe Tucker (Jason Wiles), according to NBC.com, is the official leader of the group and is forceful and direct. He also knows military hand signals. Although he prefers to keep his personal life to himself, and never reveals what his occupation is or why he might have been taken, he claimed that he was in New York when he was abducted. Joe is also competing with Ericka for the heart of Janet. He claims to be deathly allergic to bee stings.  Later in the series, it was revealed that Joe was a Roman Catholic priest before he was part of the Program.
Janet Cooper (Daisy Betts) is a day-care owner from San Francisco. She is a single mother to a five-year-old girl, Megan Cooper. She was once married. However, her husband left in the middle of the night, abandoning his daughter and wife. Janet has a strained relationship with her mother whom she claims was abusive. Janet has hired investigators to find her husband.
Sergeant Graham McNair (Chadwick Boseman) is a level-headed Marine. He is a devout Muslim at the beginning of the series, stating that he became devout due to the treatment of prisoners at a government facility that housed alleged terrorists. He also worked as a mercenary at one time with tragic results.
Moira Doherty (Tina Holmes) was a mental patient at St. Mary's Hospital in Sandusky, Ohio. Moira is the most peaceful and kindly of the abducted people, but has a darker past. It is implied that she is a habitual liar. She serves as the doctor of the group.
Tori Fairchild (Kate Lang Johnson) is a wealthy socialite. Her father is the American ambassador to Italy and former head of the CIA. The NBC website described her as "privileged, pragmatic, and manipulative". She woke up in the hotel having no knowledge of where she was because she thought she "partied too much". She believes her father has sent her to the location to punish her for tarnishing his political image. She implies that he exchanged promises of her sexual favors to important political figures.
Erika Taylor (Kandyse McClure), according to NBC.com, is a tough as nails ex-con who sees everyone as her enemy even her fellow abductees. Erika has an eleven-year-old son named Anton and reveals that before arriving she was executed at the prison in which she was confined.
Bill Blackham (Sean O'Bryan), according to NBC.com, is a slick opportunist whose first priority is himself. Blackham describes himself as a used-car salesman, and stated that the last thing he remembers before finding himself in the hotel was being pulled over by the police in a traffic stop. He is very mistrustful of those around him, but the other abductees are dismissive of him.
Charlie Morse (Alan Ruck) is the CEO of a very successful investment firm. He is married and states that his wife is mentally unstable and emotionally, if not physically, dependent on him. According to NBC.com, he is "a fierce fighter who doesn't take kindly to being intimidated or threatened."

Other characters

Mark Renbe (Gerald Kyd) is a journalist in San Francisco who is always on the lookout for scandal. He investigates the bizarre disappearance of his ex-wife Janet Cooper despite his boss believing that there is no story there.
Kat Damatto (Lola Glaudini) is "a smart, sexy and hard-nosed editor at a muck-raking tabloid" in San Francisco. She is Mark Renbe's boss and lover. She is also fluent in Italian and Spanish.
The Night Manager (Andy Greenfield) is the sole employee of the hotel in which the abductees awake. He first appears in their first evening in town. He represents himself as another pawn in the abductions but is later revealed to be part of the Program.
Sam Edick (Michael Harney) is introduced as a private detective Janet Cooper hired to find her missing husband.
Tom X (Reggie Lee) is introduced as the head of the staff at the Chinese restaurant in the town.
Robert Gomez (Carlos Lacamara) is a police detective who continually communicates with Mark.
Liam Ulrich (Alan Smyth) is the second-in command of "The Program". He first appears in Episode 8, "Saved".
 Ambassador Franklin Fairchild (James Read) has been a member of the program for 30 years. He  is Tori Fairchild's father. Tori believes he is guilty of her mother's death. He appeared in six episodes.
Helen (Joanna Lipari) has been the director of the program for 25 years.  She has a twin sister, the deranged, Angela Barragan, that is visited by Kat and Mark to learn more information about the program

Episodes 

† These episodes of the series did not air on some NBC affiliates (including its flagship owned-and-operated station in New York City, as well as its affiliates in Detroit and Seattle, to name a few) due to local NFL preseason games that were scheduled to air in those cities in late August before NBC moved the show from Monday to Saturday nights.
‡ The episode "Seven Sacrifices" did not air on NBC at all, due to the network making the decision to air an NFL on NBC broadcast. Instead the episode was posted on NBC.com.

Production
Persons Unknown was produced by Fox Television Studios through its international model, where series are produced for the United States market with the help of international financing. Filming occurs in foreign locations where production costs are lower, and the series is "pre-sold" to international broadcasters. The completed series is then pitched for sale to American networks for pick up.

Persons Unknown was created by Christopher McQuarrie. In September 2008, Fox announced that it was beginning production of the series, which was co-financed by Televisa in Mexico and Italy's RAI. Filming began in late October 2008 in Mexico City, soon after announcement that Michael Rymer was hired to direct the first episode. Thirteen episodes were produced.

In March 2009, Variety reported that Fox was looking for a network to purchase the series. NBC announced it had acquired the broadcast rights to the series in July 2009.

In July 2010, executive producer Remi Aubuchon promised that the show would “provide all the answers to the questions that we set up”. The series finale was criticized for not following through on this statement. On April 3, 2012, in an interview with CliqueClack TV, Aubuchon revealed many of the unanswered plot points of the series, including some of what was planned for a second season.

DVD release
The complete series DVD, titled "Persons Unknown: The Complete First Season" was intended to be released on September 7, 2010 after being pushed back from an initial August 14, 2010 release. It has yet to be released.

Reception

Critical response 
Randee Dawn of Associated Press wrote that its "clever setup and moody atmosphere make this place worth checking into." Maureen Ryan of the Chicago Tribune said the "...pilot efficiently lays out its premise and ratchets up the pressure on the characters, who are only types so far, but it doesn't matter because the plot's the thing here." Overall the show received mixed or average reviews according to Metacritic where it received a score of 49 points out of 100. Rotten Tomatoes reported that the show had a 61% approval rating based on 18 critic reviews, stating "Persons Unknown squanders its intriguing premise by plopping ill-defined characters into a scenario that calls for compelling personalities -- thankfully, viewers can easily find the exit from this hell of other people."

Ratings

See also
 Wayward Pines - another TV series with the same premise of a town that no one can escape from.

References

External links 
 
 

2010 American television series debuts
2010 American television series endings
2010s American drama television series
2010s American mystery television series
English-language television shows
NBC original programming
Serial drama television series
Television series by 20th Century Fox Television
Television shows filmed in Mexico
Television shows set in Mexico City
Works by Christopher McQuarrie